William Frank Edwards (24 October 1895 – 4 June 1952) was a Welsh professional footballer who played in the Football League for Newport County and West Ham United as an outside right. He later represented Herefordshire at bowls and won the National Triples title in 1950.

Personal life 
Prior to his service in the First World War, Edwards worked as a motor driver. In July 1915, nearly a year after the outbreak of the First World War, Edwards enlisted in the Royal Flying Corps as an air mechanic 1st class. He was later promoted to the rank of leading aircraftman. After retiring from football, Edwards became a publican in Hereford and along with his brother, he served as a director of Hereford United.

Career statistics

References

1895 births
1952 deaths
Welsh footballers
Association football outside forwards
Fulham F.C. wartime guest players
Queens Park Rangers F.C. wartime guest players
Brentford F.C. wartime guest players
Newport County A.F.C. players
Shrewsbury Town F.C. players
West Ham United F.C. players
Hereford United F.C. players
Llanelli Town A.F.C. players
Watford F.C. wartime guest players
Fulham F.C. players
Royal Air Force personnel of World War I
Male bowls players
Hereford United F.C. non-playing staff
Royal Flying Corps soldiers
Royal Air Force airmen
Welsh military personnel